The Giro del Sol San Juan is a multi-day road cycling race held annually in Argentina. It takes place in January in the province of San Juan. It has been held as a 2.2 event on the UCI America Tour in 2009 and again since 2023.

Winners

References

Cycle races in Argentina
Recurring sporting events established in 2002
UCI America Tour
2002 establishments in Argentina